The 1969 Cronulla-Sutherland Sharks season was the 3rd in the club's history. They competed in the NSWRFL's 1969 premiership.

Ladder

References

Cronulla-Sutherland Sharks seasons
Cronulla-Sutherland Sharks season